John James Poncar (October 16, 1913 – January 1, 2010) was an American professional basketball player. He played in the National Basketball League for the Cleveland Chase Brassmen during the 1943–44 season and averaged 1.7 points per game.

References

1913 births
2010 deaths
American men's basketball players
Basketball players from Ohio
Centers (basketball)
Cleveland Chase Brassmen players
Cleveland Rosenblums players
Forwards (basketball)